The wildlife of Libya is spread over the Mediterranean coastline and  encompasses large areas of the Saharan desert. The protection of wildlife is provided through appropriate legislation in seven national parks, five reserves, 24 protected areas, two wetlands under Ramsar Convention, and also in other areas. Apart from these, there are also five UNESCO World Heritage Sites related to culture. The most important national parks are the El-Kouf National Park and Karabolli National Park. The well known nature reserves are the Benghazi Reserve and the Zellaf Reserve. The wildlife species recorded in the country are 87 mammals and 338 species of birds.

Its hills, ponds and coastal habitats which comprise coral reefs, mangroves, sea grass beds, salt marshes, and mud flats add to its biodiversity. Some of the sites are important for migratory birds.

Laws for regulation
National laws and international agreements are part of the preservation of biodiversity and wetland culture in the country. The Green Mountain Area is under protection to protect  of the mountainous areas with the project titled “Green Mountain Conservation and Development Authority". The first conservation legislation enacted in 1949 was the Law on Forestry. The purpose of this legislation was to ensure protection to forests and forest products, and also retain soil conditions, enhance water sources availability and utilization, and to prevent desertification. In 1970, the Law for the Protection of Agricultural Land was enacted as an ordinance to protect the green areas. The first national park came into existence in November 1978. This was followed by many other national parks to preserve and conserve wild animals in the reserves where the threat was real. In 1990, the Technical Committee of Wildlife and National Parks was established exclusively to ensure proper management of the protected areas, as part of the General Secretariat of Agricultural Reclamation and Land Reform. With this setup, all protected areas are now under the management control of the Government of Libya.

Geography

Protected areas in Libya are under four categories of national parks, protected reserves, protected areas, and wetlands, and a few others areas, which cover coastal, marine and terrestrial areas. The seven national parks are: The Abughilan National Park, the El Kouf National Park, the Karabolli National Park, the Naggaza National Park, the Rajma National Park and the Sirman National Park of which Karabolli and Kouf cover the coastal and marine areas. The five nature reserves are: The Benghazi Reserve, the Bier Ayyad Reserve, the New Hiesha Natural Reserve, the Tripoli Reserve and the Zellaf Reserve. There are 24 protected areas: Ain Zayanah, Ajdabiya Marsh, Al Jaghbub Oasis, Berjuj Valley, Bombe gulf, Fezzan valleys, Garabulli, Giarabub, Grotto de Lete, Harouj Mountain, Jalo, Kufrah Oasis, Nefhusa, Oasis of Ghat, Ouau en Namu lakes, Qaminis and Tukrah salines, Rajma plantations, Sabratha, Sebkha el Sahel, Serir, Shahaat, Taizerbo, Taoulga islands (Thaouara), and Wadi Kham. The wetlands designated under Ramsar Convention are the Ain Elshakika Wetland and the Ain Elzarga Wetland. According to the list of ecoregions classified by the World Wide Fund for Nature (WWF), Libya is inscribed under the eco-regions of Palearctic Mediterranean Forests, Woodlands and Scrub, and Mediterranean Sea.

National parks

The area is bounded by Jabel Al-Akhdar Mountain (elevation  and of limestone formation) forming a rectangular area bordered by the coast line of the Mediterranean Sea. The Karabolli National Park, located in the north-west part of Libya, was established in 1992. The nearest town to the park is Al Garabulli. Many streams with spring as their source drain the park area. The park habitat is made up of sand dunes, beaches, cliffs and salt lagoons. It was identified as Bird Life Sanctuary in 1992, and hosts 100 species of birds.

Nature reserves
There are five nature reserves in Libya.

Wetlands
There are two wetlands of "International Importance" inscribed under the Ramsar Convention. These are:

It also covers part of the Kouf National Park. It is a hypersaline coastal sebkha ('sebka' means: "depression"). The geological formation, on its southern part, consists of limestone. Sand dunes, mudflats and large areas of shrubs are also part of this wetland. Its importance is on account of migratory and resident waterbirds, which provide ample opportunities for bird watching and also for eco-tourism.

Its small coastal depression has link with the sea and hence water is visible in the wetland throughout the year, though saline particularly in summer. This land of marshes and mud flats is bounded on the south and east by rocky hills and sand dunes. It runs from east to west. It is part of the Kouf National Park and is important on account of the large population of migratory birds. Its potential for bird watching is also of eco-tourism interest.

Wildlife

Flora

The plants found in the coastal zone are mostly herbaceous with abundance of grasses. The most recorded species are the asphodel (a herb of family of lily), Jabule, bougainvillea and oleander. There are also many plants under cultivation such as citrus and olive. There is a narrow buffer zone along the coast where agriculture is practiced. This zone also has grass lands. Influenced by the Mediterranean climate, the region has dense forest or maquis of juniper and lentisc trees, and also brome grass, canary grass, bluegrass, and rye grass. Since rainfall in the area is scanty, the cultivated trees consists of figs and olives. In the Nafusah Plateau, grasslands form the dominant vegetation. Moving towards south of the mountain range, Sahara desert environment dominates the region with limited cultivation of palm and fig trees around springs and natural oases. Date palms (near the oases), saltwort (used for making soda ash), spurge flax shrub, goosefoot, wormwood, and asphodel, cyrenaica are also reported in the wild. Sea grass meadows are reported to cover  between the Gulf of Sirte in Libya and the Gulf of Gabes in Tunisia.

There are nearly 134 vascular plant species which are specific to Libya. These include:
Cyclamen (rohlfsianum)
Arbutus pavarii
Sedum
Anacamptis orchid (cyrenaica)
Echinops cyrenaicus
Linaria tarhunensis
Pallenis cyrenaica
Allium negrianum
Silene cyrenaica
Hypericum tauberti (Zürcher Herbarien)
Cynara cyrenaica
Poa pentapolitana
Romulea cyrenaica
Satureja
linearifolia
Nepeta cyrenaica
Crocus boulosii
Euphorbia pseudoapios
Limonium teuchirae, Asperula tragacanthoides
Orobanche cyrenaica
Pachyctenium
Libyella
The last two plant species listed above are of endemic genera.

Fauna

Mammals

Along the coast, the Mediterranean monk seal is a well known species. It has been listed in the IUCN Red List as Critically Endangered in Libya. In the Jbel Acacus region, from the rock art work of animal forms seen in the far southwest of the country, it is inferred that African elephants, giraffes and rhinos inhabited the area in the past during the Ice age when the land was fertile. As of now, very few animals live in the area, like the striped hyenas (Hyaena hyaena), fennec fox, gazelles, African wildcats and golden wolves. The cheetah is now extinct from the area. Reptiles and rodents are common in the sands of the desert. Red shrimp are reported from the Ubari Lakes in the Fezan area. The faunal species recorded include Canis anthus, Vulpes vulpes, Genetta genetta, Felis libyca, Hystrix cristata, Delphinus delphis and Tursiops truncatus.

Mammals and reptiles found in Libya which are on the Red List of IUCN, are: Grobben's gerbil, the Alexandrian shrew and the orangetail lizard (Philochortus zolii).

Apart from the above, the mammal species identified in the reference book Mammal Species of the World are:
Gerbillus
Hendecapleura
grobbeni
syrticus
Gerbillus (Gerbillus tarabuli)
Gerbillus (Hendecapleura)Gerbillus vivaxPsammomys vexillarisCtenodactylus gundi Ctenodactylus vali Pipistrellus (Pipistrellus) (deserti)Ictonyx libyc Camelus dromedarius Elephantulus rozeti Procavia capensis Eliomys melanurus Eliomys munbyanus Allactaga (Scarturus) (tetradactyla)Jaculus jaculusJaculus orientalisMicrotus (Microtus) (guentheri)
 Acomys (Acomys) (cahirinus)
 Dipodillus (Dipodillus simoni)
 Gerbillus (Hendecapleura) amoenus Gerbillus (Gerbillus) andersoni Gerbillus (Gerbillus) latastei Meriones (Pallasiomys) shawi Mus (Mus) spretus Massoutiera mzabi Atelerix algirus Hemiechinus auritus Rhinolophus clivosus Rhinolophus mehelyi Tadarida teniotis Nyctalus lasiopterus Pipistrellus (Pipistrellus) pygmaeus Oto nycteris hemprichiiMyotis punicusVulpes zerdaAlcelaphus buselaphusGazella cuvieriGazella dorcasGazella leptocerosAmmotragus lerviaAddax nasomaculatusOryx dammahDendromurinaeDipodillus (Petteromys) campestrisGerbillus gerbillusGerbillus Hendecapleura henleyiGerbillus Hendecapleura nanusMeriones Pallasiomys crassusMeriones Pallasiomys libycus Rattus norvegicusNyctalus leisleri (lesser noctule) batRhinopoma hardwickii (lesser mouse-tailed bat)

Rodents
The rodents reported are: Pachyuromys duprasi (fat-tailed gerbil), Meriones libycus (Libyan jird), Ctenodactylus gundi (gundi), Meriones crassus (Sundevall's jird), Meriones crassus (Sundevall's jird), Spalacidae (blind mole-rat, Common mole-rats, zokors, and bamboo rats), Elephantulus rozeti (North African elephant shrew), Spalacinae (blind mole-rats), Arvicolinae (lemmings and voles), Jaculus orientalis  (greater Egyptian jerboa), Massoutiera mzabi (Mzab gundi), and Spalax ehrenbergi (Middle East blind mole-rat).

Birds

In the coastal belt, bird species recorded are Greater flamingo on the beaches, and also many birds of prey. Migratory birds pass through Libya, and are seen mostly along the coastline. The most notable ones are the flamingo, Kentish plover in the Bengazi Reserve. Houbara bustard and the European white stork are reported in the Kouf National Park and in the beaches and lagoons. In the oases, desert larks, desert sparrows, and spotted sandgrouse have been reported. Other notable species reported are Aquila chrysaetos, Alectoris barbara, Pterocles spp. and Chlamydotis undulata with herons, ducks, waders, Ciconia nigra, Ciconia ciconia, and Milvus milvus (red kite) from the brackish lagoons.

Invertebrates
Invertebrates exclusive to Libya are:
longhorned beetle (Chlorophorus ringenbachi)
weevil (Caulostrophus ringenbachi)
jewel beetle (Paratassa ringenbachi)
tiger beetle (Neolaphrya ritchiei)
cockchafer (Pachydema peyerhimhoffi)
dung beetle (Onitis ringenbachi)
darkling beetle (Tentyria cyrenaica)
blister beetle (Mylabris cyrenaica)
planthopper (Dictyophara merjensis)
leafhopper (Wadkufia elegans)
bees (Nomioides mucoreus)
Lasioglossum tripolitanum
scorpion (Buthus barcaeus)
millipede (Glomeris monostriata) (found in caves)
land snails (Barcania kaltenbachi)
Cochlostoma susaense

Molluscs

Some of the 'non-marine molluscs of Libya, which are a part of the molluscan fauna of Libya, are, Melanoides tuberculata (O. F. Müller, 1774) listed under IUCN as of least concern, Parmacella festae (Gambetta, 1925 - northern Libya), and Parmacella olivieri (Cuvier, 1804 - northern Libya).

Marine fauna

The Libyan coast is rich in fish production and many edible marine organisms. The Marine Biology Research Centre (MBRC) facilitated selection of coastal areas under Marine Protected Areas (MPAs). The key MPAs established were the El Kouf National Park, Ain Gazala Farwa, El Burdi, and Ain -Ziyana. Reported marine mammal species include the monk seal Monachus monachus (CR) on the coast, and Tursiops truncatus offshore.

The coastal area and the Mediterranean Sea is reported as the nesting areas for the loggerhead turtle (Caretta caretta), and juveniles of bluefin tuna (Thunnus thynnus), nearing extinction. The killifish (Aphanius desioi'') is an IUCN Red List species.

Conservation
The threats faced by the national parks, reserves and protected areas have been identified. These are due to excessive logging operations, poaching of birds, unauthorised felling of trees, alteration of the habitat status due to pollution, land use, climate change, and inadequate management measures.

The measures under implementation to address the threats identified in the protected areas are in the form of protecting the ecosystems and biodiversity, conducting scientific research in identified areas, creating public awareness, ensuring sustainability of resources, promote ecotourism, creation of protected areas conforming to different ecosystems, and setting up of adequate management mechanism.

References

Bibliography
 
 
 

Biota of Libya
Libya